Jeong Yeon-shik  (born August 6, 1967) is a South Korean film director, screenwriter and web-cartoon artist. Jeong worked as a commercials director and illustrator before he became known for his web-cartoons Moonlight Shoes and The 5ive Hearts. His directorial feature debut - the thriller The Five (2013), is based on his webtoon The 5ive Hearts, making him the first webtoonist turned film director in Korea.

Filmography 
The Five (2013) - director, screenwriter, original story

Webtoon 
Moonlight Shoes
The 5ive Hearts

References

External links 
 
 
 

1967 births
Living people
South Korean film directors
South Korean screenwriters